The Armenia–Turkey border is 311 km (193 m) in length and runs from the tripoint with Georgia in the north to the tripoint with Azerbaijan in the south. The land border has been closed since 3 April 1993.

Description
The border starts in the north at the tripoint with Georgia just west of Lake Arpi and proceeds southwards via series of irregular lines through the Armenian Highlands. Upon reaching the Akhurian River it follows the river south down to the confluence with the Aras river, and then follows the Aras as it flows east and then south-east, down to the tripoint with Azerbaijan's Nakhchivan Autonomous Republic. The ancient ruins of Ani lie directly adjacent to the border on the Turkish side.

History

During the 19th century, the Caucasus region was contested between the declining Ottoman Empire, Persia and Russia, which was expanding southwards. Russia had conquered most of Persia's Caucasian lands by 1828, including all of what is now Armenia (termed Eastern Armenia), and then turned its attention to the Ottoman Empire. With the 1829 Treaty of Adrianople (ending the Russo-Turkish War of 1828–29), by which Russia gained most of modern Georgia, the Ottomans recognised Russian suzerainty over eastern Armenia.

By the Treaty of San Stefano, ending the Russo-Turkish War (1877–1878), Russia gained considerable land in what is now eastern Turkey (termed Western Armenia), extending the Ottoman-Russian frontier south-westwards. Russia's gains of Batumi, Kars and Ardahan were confirmed by the Treaty of Berlin (1878), though it was compelled to hand back part of the area around Bayazid (modern Doğubayazıt) and the Eleşkirt valley.

During the First World War Russia invaded the eastern areas of the Ottoman Empire. In the chaos following the 1917 Russian Revolution the new Communist government hastily sought to end its involvement in the war and signed the Treaty of Brest-Litovsk in 1918 with Germany and the Ottoman Empire. By this treaty, Russia handed back the areas gained by the earlier Treaties of San Stefano and Berlin.

Seeking to gain independence from both empires, the peoples of the southern Caucasus had declared the Transcaucasian Democratic Federative Republic in 1918 and started peace talks with the Ottomans. Internal disagreements led to Georgia leaving the federation in May 1918, followed shortly thereafter by Armenia and Azerbaijan. With the Ottomans having invaded the Caucasus and quickly gained ground, the three new republics were compelled to sign the Treaty of Batum on 4 June 1918, by which they recognised the pre-1878 border. Armenia in particular was reeling from the aftermath of the Ottoman-led Armenian genocide, which resulted in vast numbers of refugees fleeing Western Armenia.

With the Ottoman Empire defeated in Europe and Arabia, the Allied powers planned to partition it via the 1920 Treaty of Sèvres. The treaty recognised Georgian and Armenian independence, granting both vast lands in eastern Turkey (in Armenia's case this was dubbed 'Wilsonian Armenia', after US President Woodrow Wilson), with an extended Armenia-Georgia border to be decided at a later date. Turkish nationalists were outraged at the treaty, contributing to the outbreak the Turkish War of Independence; the Turkish success in this conflict rendered Sèvres obsolete. Ottoman gains in Armenia were consolidated by the Treaty of Aleksandropol (1920).

In 1920 Russia's Red Army had invaded Azerbaijan and Armenia, ending the independence of both, followed shortly thereafter by Georgia. In order to avoid an all-out Russo-Turkish war the two nations signed the Treaty of Moscow in March 1921, which created a modified Soviet-Ottoman border. However, further fighting took place on the ground and the talks stalled; the treaty's provisions were later confirmed by the Treaty of Kars of October 1921, finalising what is now the Armenia–Turkey border at its current position. The border was then demarcated on the ground in March 1925 – July 1926 by a joint Soviet-Turkish commission. Turkey's independence had been recognised by the 1923 Treaty of Lausanne.

Armenia was initially incorporated along with Georgia and Azerbaijan in the Transcaucasian SFSR within the USSR, before being split off as the Armenian Soviet Socialist Republic in 1936.
The Kars Treaty border remained, despite occasional Soviet protests that it should be amended, notably in 1945. Turkey, backed by the US, refused to discuss the matter, and the Soviets, seeking better relations with their southern neighbour, dropped the issue.

Following the collapse of the USSR in 1991 Armenia gained independence and inherited its section of the Turkey-USSR border. Though Turkey recognised Armenian independence, relations between the two countries almost immediately soured and the border was shut: Turkey opposed irredentist claims to eastern Turkey by Armenian nationalists championing a 'United Armenia', as well as Armenia's efforts to achieve international recognition of the Armenian genocide; Turkey also supported its close ally Azerbaijan in the First Nagorno-Karabakh War. Relations thawed slightly in the 2000s decade, resulting in the signing of the Zurich Protocols in 2009, in which it was envisaged the border could re-open. The talks foundered, however, and the border remains closed.

Settlements near the border

Armenia

Amasia
 Byurakn
 Gyumri
 Akhurik
 Haykadzor
 Anipemza
 Tlik
 Getap
 Aragatsavan
 Bagaran
 Vanand 
 Yervandashat
 Armavir
 Nalbandyan
 Janfida
 Pshatavan
 Margara
 Ranchpar
 Masis
 Mkhchyan
 Artashat
 Lusarat
 Yeghegnavan
 Ararat
 Aygavan
 Ararat

Turkey

 Duruyol
 Akyaka
 Kars
 Kocaköy
 Tuzluca
 Iğdır
 Karakoyunlu 
 Alican
 Taşburun
 Aralık

Crossings

There were three crossings along the entire border, two for vehicular traffic and one for vehicular and rail traffic. They have been closed since 3 April 1993.

In July 2022, the Turkish Ministry for Foreign Affairs announced that the two countries, in the context of a general thaw of their relationship, plan to reopen the border "at the earliest possible date", albeit only for third party nationals.

In February 2023, Alican border crossing was opened to allow the passage of humanitarian aid from Armenia to Turkey following the 2023 Turkey–Syria earthquake 
.It was used lastly following Spitak earthquake in Soviet Armenia.

Gallery

See also
 Armenia–Turkey relations

References

 
Turkey
Borders of Turkey
International borders